The Sony α7R IV (model ILCE-7RM4) is a full-frame mirrorless interchangeable-lens camera manufactured by Sony. It was announced on 16 July 2019 as the successor to the Sony α7R III launched two years prior.

Image gallery

Features
The Sony α7R IV improved upon the earlier Sony α7R III in several notable ways:
 Increased sensor resolution, from 42.4 megapixels to 61.0 megapixels
 Increased Phase Detect Autofocus points, from 399 to 567 while maintaining the same 425 Contrast Detect Autofocus points
 Increased the number of images pixel shift uses, from a maximum of 4 to a maximum of 16
 Both memory card slots are UHS-II
 Eye Autofocus is available in video mode
 Better ergonomics in the camera body, specifically with regard to the hand grip, exposure compensation dial, and weather sealing

Awards
The α7R IV won 2020 Camera of The Year, and Readers Award in the Japanese Camera Press Club's Camera Grand Prix.

See also
Comparison of Sony α7 cameras
Sony α9
Exmor R

References

External links
 α7R IV

α7R IV
Cameras introduced in 2019
Full-frame mirrorless interchangeable lens cameras